Henry Hague Judah,  (April 28, 1808 – February 10, 1883), was a lawyer and political figure in Canada East. Judah was among the first Jews to become lawyers in early Canada; the first was a distant cousin, Aaron Ezekiel Hart, son of Ezekiel Hart, called to the bar in 1824.

Judah was born in London in 1808. He studied law at Trois-Rivières, was called to the bar in 1829 and set up practice at Trois-Rivières.  He married Harline Kimber, the daughter of a doctor René-Joseph Kimber, in 1834. In 1840, he moved his practice to Montreal.

Judah was elected to the Legislative Assembly of the Province of Canada for Champlain in an 1843 by-election held after his father-in-law was named to the Legislative Council. He was named Queen's Counsel in 1854. He helped found the Montreal City and District Savings Bank (now the Laurentian Bank of Canada) and later served as its president. Judah also helped promote the Montreal and Bytown Railway.

Judah died at Montreal in 1883.

Judah's cousin Ezekiel Hart, was expelled from his seat in the legislative assembly of Lower Canada because he was a Jew. He was also related to Joseph-Rémi Vallières de Saint-Réal's second wife.

External links

Henry Hague Judah en 1873

1808 births
1883 deaths
Jewish Canadian politicians
Members of the Legislative Assembly of the Province of Canada from Canada East
Canadian King's Counsel